David Little (born 1 July 1974) is a New Zealand cricketer. He played in one first-class and three List A matches for Wellington in 1998/99.

See also
 List of Wellington representative cricketers

References

External links
 

1974 births
Living people
New Zealand cricketers
Wellington cricketers
Cricketers from Lower Hutt